Off Limits (1997) is a science fiction anthology edited by Ellen Datlow. It was published in 1996 by St. Martin's Press. It includes four previously published stories and 14 new ones.

Contents
partial listing:
Neil Gaiman: "Eaten"
Gwyneth Jones: "Red Sonja and Lessingham in Dreamland"
Simon Ings:"Grand Prix"
Richard Christian Matheson: "Oral"
Bruce McAllister: "Captain China"
Susan Wade: "The Tattooist"
Joyce Carol Oates:
Samuel R. Delany:
Elizabeth Hand:
Robert Silverberg:
Joe Haldeman:
Jane Yolen:
Brian Stableford:

1997 anthologies
Science fiction anthologies
St. Martin's Press books